The men's 400 metres event at the 1975 Summer Universiade was held at the Stadio Olimpico in Rome on 18 and 19 September.

Medalists

Results

Heats
Held on 18 September

Semifinals
Held on 19 September

Final
Held on 19 September

References

Athletics at the 1975 Summer Universiade
1975